Itihas (English: The History) is a 2002 Bangladeshi film starring Kazi Maruf as the protagonist. He received a Bangladesh National Film Award for Best Actor for his performance in the film. It also stars Ratna, Moushumi and Kazi Hayat.

Cast

Track listing 
"Tumi Koi Tumi Koi" - Asif Akbar and Baby Naznin
"Prem Koreche Prithibite" - Asif Akbar and Baby Naznin
"Mone Jodi Pochon Dhore" - Momtaz

Awards 
Bangladesh National Film Awards
Best Director - Kazi Hayat
Best Actor - Kazi Maruf
Best Editing - Mujibur Rahman Dulu

References

2002 films
Bengali-language Bangladeshi films
Films scored by Ahmed Imtiaz Bulbul
2000s Bengali-language films